El Salvador competed at the 2013 World Games held in Cali, Colombia. Two competitors represented El Salvador; they both competed in the men's compound archery event.

Medalists

Archery 

Roberto Hernández won the bronze medal in the men's compound event. Jorge Jiménez also competed in the men's compound event.

References 

Nations at the 2013 World Games
2013 in Salvadoran sport
2013